Bitale is an administrative ward in Kigoma District of Kigoma Region in Tanzania. 
In 2016 the Tanzania National Bureau of Statistics report there were 22,482 people in the ward, from 20,425 in 2012.

Villages / neighborhoods 
The ward has 6 villages and 38 hamlets.

 Kizenga
 Kaseke
 Katandala
 Kizenga Kati
 Kumnege
 Nyakiga Stoo
 Uzinza
 Bitale
 Bitale Shuleni
 Bitale Sokoni
 Bolelo
 Kisangarani
 Mlege
 Nkuruba
 kayogoro
 Mkongoro
 CCM Centre
 Kasagamba
 Kaseke
 Majengo A
 Majengo B
 Nyamweha Chini
 Nyamweha Juu
 Nyete Juu
 Nyamhoza
 Mlwanga
 Nyabigufa
 Nyamhoza Hill
 Nyamhoza Shuleni
 Sumpa
 Chankele
 Buhagala
 Hwazi
 Kitelama
 Mbalizi
 Mlambi
 Bubango 
 Hwazi
 Kabasaka
 Kirundo
 Kumsenga
 Mwigogi
 Nyachanga
 Nyahande

References

Wards of Kigoma Region